The 2009–10 RFU Championship was the 1st season (of the professionalised format) of the second division of the English domestic rugby union competitions, played between August 2009 and May 2010.  The league had been restructured from the 16 teams of the previous season down to just 12.  New teams included Bristol who had been relegated from the Guinness Premiership 2008–09 and Birmingham and Solihull who had been promoted from National Division Two 2008–09.  As well as a decrease in teams, the league would now consist of three parts - a standard league section, promotion/relegation pools and then playoffs to determine who would go up as champions.

During this season, Exeter Chiefs won promotion to the Aviva Premiership 2010–11 by beating Bristol in the playoff final.  This marked Exeter's first ever promotion to the Premiership, which they would later win in 2017.

Despite finishing 11th of 12 after the first stage Coventry were relegated to the 2010–11 National League 1 as they finished bottom of the relegation pool.

Participating teams 

Notes

Stage 1 League Table

Results

Round 1

Round 2

Round 3

Round 4

Round 5

Round 6

Round 7

Round 8

Round 9

Round 10

Round 11

Round 12

Round 13

Round 14 

Postponed. Game rescheduled to 2 February 2010.

Round 15 

Postponed. Game rescheduled to 20 January 2010.

Postponed. Game rescheduled to 20 January 2010.

Round 16 

Postponed. Game rescheduled to 10 February 2010.

Postponed. Game rescheduled to 11 February 2010.

Round 17 

Postponed. Game rescheduled to 24 February 2010.

Round 15 (Rescheduled Games) 

Game rescheduled from 28 December 2009.

Game rescheduled from 28 December 2009.

Round 18

Round 19 

Postponed. Game rescheduled to 17 February 2010.

Round 14 (Rescheduled Game) 

Game rescheduled to 19 December 2009.

Round 20

Round 16 & 19 (Rescheduled Games) 

Game rescheduled from 2 January 2010.

Game rescheduled from 2 January 2010.

Game rescheduled from 30 January 2010.

Round 21

Round 17 (Rescheduled Game) 

Game rescheduled from 15 January 2010.

Round 22

Stage 2: Playoffs

Promotion 
Winner of Pool A to play Runner-Up of Pool B, and Winner of Pool B to play Runner-Up of Pool A.

Group A:

Round 1

Round 2

Round 3

Round 4

Round 5

Round 6 

Group B:

Round 1

Round 2

Round 3

Round 4

Round 5

Round 6

Relegation 
Bottom club in Group C relegated to National League 1

Group C:

 Birmingham & Solihull deducted 2 points for fielding an unregistered player

Coventry are relegated to National League 1.

Round 1

Round 2

Round 3

Round 4 

Postponed. Game rescheduled to 24 April 2010.

Round 5

Round 4 (Rescheduled Game)

Round 6

Stage 3

Semi-finals 

The semifinals were one-off single ties held between the winner of Group A and the runner-up of Group B, and the winner of Group B and the runner-up of Group A. The matches took place at the home ground of the group winners.

Final 

The two-legged final took place at the home grounds of the two clubs involved, rather than at Twickenham.

Exeter Chiefs win the Championship and earn promotion to the 2010–11 Premiership.

Total Season Attendances 
 Figures include playoff semi finals and final

Individual statistics 

Player stats include playoff games as well as regular season games.  Also note that points scorers includes tries as well as conversions, penalties and drop goals.

Top points scorers

Top try scorers

Season records

Team
Largest home win — 52 pts
62 - 10 Cornish Pirates at home to Birmingham & Solihull on 25 October 2009
Largest away win — 45 pts
60 - 15 Bristol away to Cornish Pirates on 1 May 2010
Most points scored — 62 pts (x2)
62 - 10 Cornish Pirates at home to Birmingham & Solihull on 25 October 2009
62 - 12 Exeter Chiefs at home to Birmingham & Solihull on 13 March 2010
Most tries in a match — 10
Bristol away to Cornish Pirates on 1 May 2010
Most conversions in a match — 7
Cornish Pirates at home to Birmingham & Solihull on 25 October 2009
Most penalties in a match — 6 (x4)
Exeter Chiefs at home to Doncaster Knights on 12 September 2009
Rotherham Titans at home to Cornish Pirates on 31 October 2009
Moseley at home to Bristol on 13 March 2010
Exeter Chiefs away to Bristol on 26 May 2010
Most drop goals in a match — 2 (x3)
Doncaster Knights at home to Bristol on 24 October 2009
Rotherham Titans at home to Cornish Pirates on 31 October 2009
Exeter Chiefs away to Bristol on 26 May 2010

Player
Most points in a match — 24 (x2)
 James Pritchard for Bedford Blues at home to Nottingham on 16 January 2010
 Gareth Steenson for Exeter Chiefs away to Bristol on 26 May 2010
Most tries in a match — 4 (x2)
 Ian Davey for Bedford Blues at home to Birmingham & Solihull on 10 October 2009
 Callum MacBurnie for Moseley at home to Birmingham & Solihull on 1 May 2010
Most conversions in a match — 7
 James Moore for Cornish Pirates at home to Birmingham & Solihull on 25 October 2009
Most penalties in a match —  6 (x4)
 Gareth Steenson for Exeter Chiefs at home to Doncaster Knights on 12 September 2009
 Jonathan West for Rotherham Titans at home to Cornish Pirates on 31 October 2009
 Tristan Roberts for Moseley at home to Bristol on 13 March 2010
 Gareth Steenson for Exeter Chiefs away to Bristol on 26 May 2010
Most drop goals in a match —  2
 Gareth Steenson for Exeter Chiefs away to Bristol on 26 May 2010

Attendances
Highest — 11,550 
Bristol at home to Exeter Chiefs on 26 May 2010
Lowest — 200 
Birmingham & Solihull at home to Doncaster Knights on 17 February 2010
Highest Average Attendance — 5,922
Bristol
Lowest Average Attendance — 665
Birmingham & Solihull

References

 
2009–10 in English rugby union leagues
2009-10